Charles de Young (January 8, 1846 – April 23, 1880), along with his younger brother M. H. de Young, founded the newspaper The Daily Dramatic Chronicle, which became the San Francisco Chronicle, and was its editor-in-chief. He was murdered by Isaac M. Kalloch, son of Isaac S. Kalloch, the Mayor of San Francisco, in revenge for a feud Charles had with the mayor.

Early life and family
Charles de Young was born on January 8, 1846 in Natchitoches, Louisiana. He was the son of Cornelia "Amelia" (née Morange; 1809–1881) and Miechel de Young (died 1854), who married in 1837, and the brother of Michael Henry "Harry" de Young and Virginia de Young (died 1875).  His family, who were Jewish, had immigrated from the Netherlands and France. His maternal grandfather, Benjamin Morange, who served as the French Minister to Spain under Napoleon I, moved to the United States about 1815 and helped found the B'nai Jeshurun Congregation in New York in 1825.

Career
In 1859, he began publishing the Holiday Advertiser, a daily publication, while he was finishing his apprenticeship. The interests were sold and in 1865, he began publishing the Dramatic Chronicle with his brother, Harry. The daily paper was focused on  theater gossip, advertising and light news. The revenue from the Dramatic Chronicle allowed the brothers to begin publishing the San Francisco Chronicle in 1869. Charles focused on the content and editing of the paper, while Harry was responsible for the management of the paper on the business side.

In 1874, de Young denounced San Francisco Judge Delos Lake, which led to the two meeting in California Street for a duel during the busiest time of day. Judge Lake shot twice at de Young, who returned the shots; neither was hit.

At the time of his death, the San Francisco Chronicle was worth $250,000.

Assassination
In 1879, Isaac Smith Kalloch ran for mayor of San Francisco. It was not long before he came under attack from the San Francisco Chronicle's editor-in-chief, Charles de Young, who was backing another candidate. de Young, with the hopes of taking Kalloch out of the mayoral race, accused the minister of having an affair. Kalloch responded by accusing Charles' mother, Amelia, of running a brothel. In response, Charles de Young ambushed Kalloch in the streets of San Francisco and shot him twice. Kalloch survived the wounds and with the sympathy of voters was elected the 18th Mayor of San Francisco. He served from 1879 until 1881. On April 23, 1880, Kalloch's son, Isaac Milton Kalloch, entered the Chronicle building and shot and killed Charles de Young.

Memorial
In 1884, de Young's brother, Harry, commissioned a bronze statue of Charles, erected at the Odd Fellows Cemetery in San Francisco which cost in excess of $10,000. The statue was sculpted by F. Marion Wells, a member of the Bohemian Club in San Francisco.

References

External links
 

1845 births
1880 deaths
Charles
People from Natchitoches, Louisiana
San Francisco Chronicle founders
American people of Dutch-Jewish descent
American people of French-Jewish descent
Assassinated American journalists
Assassinated newspaper publishers (people)
Deaths by firearm in California
19th-century American businesspeople
Burials at Cypress Lawn Memorial Park